Odathil Palli (Odathil Mosque) is a 200-year-old mosque in Thalassery, a city in the state of Kerala, South India. The mosque was built around 1806.

History
In the heart of Thalassery stands the 200-year-old Odathil Palli and the Garden Mosque. The site of the Odathil Palli used to be a sugarcane garden of the Dutch. It changed hands to the British-owned East India Company.

Moosakaka, a Muslim Keralite, was the contractor of the East India Company. Moosakaka hailed from the Keyi family of Thalassery. The Keyis were among the prominent traders of the time.

Moosakaka was considered to be very honest and trustworthy. Hence, the company wanted to reward him for his loyalty. As per his request, he was given the Dutch sugar garden. Musakaka bought this land for a small price, as he did not want it free.

Etymology
He constructed a beautiful mosque in Thalassery in the 'Karimbin-odam' (sugarcane plantation) formerly belonged to the Dutch, occupied by the British. Odam means 'garden' in Malayalam. Since it was constructed in Odam the mosque came to be called Odathil Palli, meaning 'mosque in Odam'. The mosque had copper plate roofing and golden dome in the minor and share the scenic features as the ones noted in the Brahmonical tradition. There was opposition in laying the dome – a privilege enjoyed by the temples – so Zamorin gave speed permission to lay the domes and the minaret. It highlights the communal harmony that prevailed in those days and the policy of enlightened toleration followed by the Kerala rulers. All Muslims can offer prayers. In the Kabaristan (graveyard adjacent to the mosque) only the dead bodies of those related to Keyis are buried.

Highlights
Odathil Palli is a destination that tourists and travelers come to see. The highlights of Odathil Palli are that it has the typical Kerala architecture, and it is in the heart of Tellicherry. The crown on the roof is made of gold. The mosque is still in use for worship today. The masjid has mainly three entrance. First one is through main gate near Thalassery old Bus-stand. Next one is through Logans Road, and third is the entrance through backyard of the building which connected to OV Road.

See also
 Keyi Family
 Chovvakkaran Moosa
 Thalassery
 Thalassery Fort
 Overbury's Folly
 Thalassery Pier

Mosques in Kerala
Buildings and structures in Thalassery
Religious buildings and structures in Kannur district